Juan Carlos Portillo may refer to:

 Juan Carlos Portillo (footballer, born 1970), Spanish former footballer
 Juan Carlos Portillo (footballer, born 1991), Salvadoran footballer
 Juan Portillo (born 2000), Argentine footballer